Prince Himalaya Pratap Bir Bikram Shah, GBE, GCMG (October 12, 1921 – May 9, 1980) was a son of Tribhuvan of Nepal and his first wife Kanti. He was a younger brother of  Mahendra, and an uncle of Birendra and Gyanendra.

Life

Himalaya, the second son of King Tribhuvan and his first wife Queen Kanti, was born in 1921. He was educated under private tutors. Himalaya represented the Nepali king on several occasions. He represented the Nepali king at the coronation of Queen Elizabeth II, at Westminster Abbey in London, in 1953.

From 1957 to 1959, Himalaya was the chairman of National Planning Commission. In 1959, he was the chairman of Tourism Development Council. The prince was the patron of Nepal Medical Association, 1951.

Himalaya married Princep Rajya Lakshmi Devi on March 5, 1945, in Kathmandu.

Himalaya died on May 9, 1980, in Kathmandu.

Honours

National honors
 Member of the Order of the Benevolent Ruler (1951).
 Member of the Tribhuvan Order of the Footprint of Democracy, 1st class.
 Member of the Order of the Star of Nepal, 1st class.
 King Mahendra Coronation Medal (2 May 1956).
 King Birendra Coronation Medal (24 February 1975).

Foreign Honours 
  :  Honorary Knight Grand Cross of the Order of the British Empire [GBE].
  : Honorary Knight Grand Cross of the Order of St Michael and St George [GCMG].
  : Queen Elizabeth II Coronation Medal (2 June 1953).
  : Knight Grand Cordon of the Order of the Rising Sun.
  : Knight Grand Cordon of the Order of the Chrysanthemum.

References

1922 births
1980 deaths
Nepalese princes
Nepalese royalty
Recipients of the Order of the Star of Nepal
Honorary Knights Grand Cross of the Order of St Michael and St George
Honorary Knights Grand Cross of the Order of the British Empire
Grand Cordons of the Order of the Rising Sun
20th-century Nepalese nobility
Nepalese Hindus